Intrepid Potash, Inc., based in Denver, Colorado, is a fertilizer manufacturer. The company is the largest producer of potassium chloride, also known as muriate of potash, in the United States. It owns three mines, all in the Western U.S., near the cities of Carlsbad, New Mexico; Moab, Utah; and Wendover, Utah.

Mines

Carlsbad
There are three sites approximately  East of Carlsbad, New Mexico. The East facility produces sylvite and langbeinite potash, and is capable of fully processing its ore to the storage or shipment stage. The West facility (currently shut down) produced mainly traditional potash, which is shipped by truck to be processed at the North facility for final storage or shipping.

Moab

The Moab or Kane Creek potash mine is located along the right (northwest) bank of the Colorado River, about 20 miles (30 km) west of Moab, Utah, at the south end of State Route 279 and the Union Pacific Railroad. The location is known as Potash on U.S. Geological Survey (USGS) topographic maps, and is east of Dead Horse Point State Park and Canyonlands National Park. According to USGS reports, the Paradox Basin contains up to 2.0 billion tons (1.8 billion metric tonnes) of potash, with the primary mine being the one at Kane Creek.

The plant was built by the Texas Gulf Sulphur Company in the early 1960s, opening in 1963 as a conventional underground mine. Later that year, an explosion trapped 25 miners, of whom only seven were able to survive, by building a barricade to trap fresh air. In 1970, operations were changed to a system that combines solution mining and solar evaporation. River water is pumped into the mine and dissolves the potash, after which the brine solution is pumped to evaporation ponds. Intrepid bought the mine in 2000 from the Potash Corporation of Saskatchewan, which had bought Texas Gulf in 1995.

Wendover

The Wendover potash mine is located about 120 miles west of Salt Lake City, Utah, and has been actively used for potash production for over 65 years.  Potash production from natural occurring brines at the Wendover facility dates back to World War I.  During the period from 1920 to 1936, a number of unsuccessful attempts were made to commercially produce potash.  By 1939, a successful commercial potash operation was achieved and has operated continuously through today.

References

Companies listed on the New York Stock Exchange
Companies based in Denver
Fertilizer companies of the United States
Mining companies of the United States